Leucopternis is a Neotropical genus of birds of prey in the family Accipitridae. They are associated with tropical forest, and are uncommon or rare. Their plumage is largely black or gray above and white below, and they have distinctive orange ceres.

Species
Traditionally, Leucopternis contains significantly more species than given here.  However, as the genus probably was polyphyletic, moves of species to other genera were proposed and have been accepted by the American Ornithologists' Union's South American Check-list Committee and North American Check-list Committee, except that the South American Committee placed the former L. lacernulatus in the existing genus Buteogallus instead of in a new genus Amadonastur by itself.  The other species were placed in the genera Cryptoleucopteryx, Morphnarchus,  Pseudastur, and Buteogallus.  According to this treatment, the species remaining in Leucopternis are:

Notes

References
 
 Lerner & Mindell (2008). Molecular phylogenetics of the buteonine birds of prey (Accipitridae). Auk 125: 304–315.
 Raposo do Amaral, Miller, Silveira, Bermingham, & Wajntal (2006). Polyphyly of the hawk genera Leucopternis and Buteogallus (Aves, Accipitridae): multiple habitat shifts during the Neotropical buteonine diversification. BMC Evol. Biol. 6: 10
 
 

 
Bird genera

Taxonomy articles created by Polbot